Thomas Degeorge (1786-1854) was a French Neoclassical painter.

References

1786 births
1854 deaths
People from Puy-de-Dôme
French neoclassical painters